Magnetic Resonance in Chemistry is a monthly peer-reviewed scientific journal covering the application of NMR, ESR, and NQR spectrometry in all branches of chemistry. The journal was established in 1969 and is published by John Wiley & Sons. The editors-in-chief are Roberto R. Gil (Carnegie Mellon University) and  Gary E. Martin (Seton Hall University).

Abstracting and indexing
The journal is abstracted and indexed in:
 Chemical Abstracts Service
 Scopus
 Science Citation Index
According to the Journal Citation Reports, the journal has a 2020 impact factor of 2.447.

Highest cited papers
According to the Web of Science, the following papers have been cited most often (> 300 times):

References

External links

Chemistry journals
Wiley (publisher) academic journals
Publications established in 1969
Monthly journals
English-language journals